Luis Felipe de la Riva Tiribocci (born May 28, 1973) is a former Uruguayan footballer who used to play as a midfielder and now is the current manager of Defensores de Belgrano.

External links
 
 Luis Felipe De La Riva at BDFA.com.ar 
 

1973 births
Living people
Footballers from Montevideo
Uruguayan footballers
Uruguayan football managers
Club Agropecuario Argentino managers
Association football midfielders